Olive Banks (2 July 1923 – 14 September 2006) was an English professor at Leicester University who worked upon the sociology of education and the history of feminism.

Early life
Banks was born in Enfield Highway, Middlesex, the only child of Herbert Alfred Davies and Jessie Louise (nee) Tebby. She married Joseph Ambrose (Joe) Banks in June 1944 and they both entered the London School of Economics to study sociology. Her PhD thesis was turned into her first book, Parity and Prestige in English Secondary Education: a Study in Educational Sociology (1955).

Career
In 1954 she accepted a research post at Liverpool University, where she was able to investigate the history of British feminism, culminating in the publishing of Feminism and Family Planning in Victorian England (1964). Her reputation as a leading scholar in her field was sealed with the publication of The Sociology of Education (1965).

In 1970 she was offered a readership at University of Leicester, and three years later became the first woman to hold a chair at that university.

A posthumous review of her life and work, "Olive Banks and the Collective Biography of British Feminism", was made by Gaby Weiner.

Retirement
Following her retirement in 1982, she continued her research, publishing a two volume Biographical Dictionary of British Feminists (1985–1990) and Becoming Feminist: The Social Origins of 'First Wave' feminism (1986). The Politics of British Feminism (1993) was her last book.

Death
She died on 14 September 2006 at the age of 83 in Buxton, Derbyshire of a heart attack.

References

British educational theorists
British feminists
British sociologists
Alumni of the London School of Economics
1923 births
2006 deaths
20th-century British historians
British women historians
Academics of the University of Leicester
20th-century British women writers